The 2015 Rally Liepāja was the second round of the 2015 European Rally Championship season, held in Latvia between 6–8 February 2015.

The rally was won by Craig Breen and Scott Martin.

Results

Standings after the rally

References

2015 in Latvian sport
2015 European Rally Championship season
Rally Liepāja